Scotch Mountain is a mountain located in the Catskill Mountains of New York south of Delhi. Devils Backbone is located southeast and Fyffe Cobble is located south of Scotch Mountain.

References

Mountains of Delaware County, New York
Mountains of New York (state)